Although the first  minister was responsible for Communications, the designation has changed over the years. The position became combined with that of Transport for many years. Over the past decade, they have remained as separate ministries, each with its own minister of state.

List of ministers

See also
Minister for Transport (Ghana)

References

Politics of Ghana
Communication